Zurich Concerts is a double live album by Barry Guy and the London Jazz Composers' Orchestra featuring recordings of two large-scale compositions, one by Guy, the other by guest artist Anthony Braxton. The Guy work was recorded on November 11, 1987, at Rote Fabrik in Zürich, while the Braxton work was recorded on March 27, 1988, at the same location. The album was initially released on LP in 1988 by Intakt Records, and was reissued on CD in 1995.

Reception

In a review for AllMusic, Thom Jurek wrote: "the attendees at these Zurich concerts were treated to the most intimate and prophetic of expressions in these two evenings. They were also given evidence of the very ground on which free improvisation and new composition stand linked to one another."

The authors of The Penguin Guide to Jazz Recordings noted that "this is one of the few occasions when [Braxton's] contact with British and European improvisors has seemed to yield a genuinely communicative music," and stated that "whereas Guy likes to work with existing sub-groups of the orchestra, Braxton layers compositions... in dense palimpsests."

CD track listing

Disc 1
 "Polyhymnia " (Barry Guy) – 37:30

Disc 2
 "Composition 135 (+41, 63, 96), 136 (+96), 108B (+86, 96), 134 (+96)" (Anthony Braxton) – 56:47

Personnel 
 Barry Guy – bass (disc 2), conductor (disc 1)
 Anthony Braxton – conductor (disc 2)
 Evan Parker – reeds
 Paul Dunmall – reeds
 Peter McPhail – reeds
 Simon Picard – reeds
 Trevor Watts – reeds
 Henry Lowther – trumpet
 Jon Corbett – trumpet
 Marc Charig – cornet
 Alan Tomlinson – trombone
 Paul Rutherford – trombone
 Radu Malfatti – trombone
 Steve Wick – tuba
 Philipp Wachsmann – violin
 Howard Riley – piano
 Barre Phillips – bass (disc 1)
 Dave Holland – bass (disc 2)
 Paul Lytton – drums
 Tony Oxley – drums (disc 2)

References

1988 live albums
Barry Guy live albums
Anthony Braxton live albums
Intakt Records live albums